Clatous Chama (born 18 June 1991) is a Zambian professional footballer who plays as an attacking midfielder for Simba S.C. and the Zambia national team. He is known for his goalscoring, playmaking, leadership, penalty taking and work rate.

Club career
Chama helped ZESCO United F.C. reach the semi-finals of the CAF Champions League before signing a 3-year contract with Egyptian side Al Ittihad. However, in February 2017, he left the club before making an official appearance. Chama played for Lusaka Dynamos F.C. before joining Tanzania's Simba S.C. in 2018.

International career

International goals
Scores and results list Zambia's goal tally first.

References

External links 
 

1991 births
Living people
Zambian footballers
Zambia international footballers
Association football midfielders
Sportspeople from Lusaka
ZESCO United F.C. players
Lusaka Dynamos F.C. players
Simba S.C. players
Zambia Super League players
Zambian expatriate sportspeople in Tanzania
Tanzanian Premier League players
Zambia A' international footballers
2016 African Nations Championship players